Albert Eugen Rollomann (25 October 1909 – 5 August 1982), better known as Dieter Borsche, was a German actor. He appeared in more than 90 films between 1935 and 1981. Since 1944, he suffered from muscle atrophy and had to use a wheelchair since the late 1970s. He was born in Hanover, Germany and died in Nuremberg, Germany. Borsche became a film star after World War II following his performance in Keepers of the Night (1949).

Selected filmography

 All Because of the Dog (1935)
 A Prussian Love Story (1938)
  Keepers of the Night (1949)
 A Day Will Come (1950)
 The Falling Star (1950)
 Dr. Holl (1951)
 The Sinful Border (1951)
 Fanfares of Love (1951)
 No Greater Love (1952)
 Father Needs a Wife (1952) 
 The Great Temptation (1952)
 Le Guérisseur (1953)
  Fanfare of Marriage (1953)
 The Chaplain of San Lorenzo (1953)
 His Royal Highness (His Royal Highness) (1953)
  Must We Get Divorced? (1953)
 Ali Baba and the Forty Thieves (1954)
 The Barrings (1955)
 I Was an Ugly Girl (1955)
 Stopover in Orly (1955)
 San Salvatore (1956)
 If We All Were Angels (1956)
 Queen Louise (1957)
 At the Green Cockatoo by Night (1957)
 A Time to Love and a Time to Die (1958)
 U 47 – Kapitänleutnant Prien (1958)
 Two Hearts in May (1958)
 I Learned That in Paris (1960)
 The Dead Eyes of London (1961)
  (1962, TV miniseries)
 Der rote Rausch (1962)
 I Must Go to the City (1962)
 The Happy Years of the Thorwalds (1962)
 The Brain (1962)
 Fanfare of Marriage (1963)
 The Lightship (1963)
 The Black Abbot (1963)
 Scotland Yard Hunts Dr. Mabuse (1963)
 The Shoot (1964)
 The Seventh Victim (1964)
 The Phantom of Soho (1964)
 The Doctor Speaks Out (1966)
 When Ludwig Goes on Manoeuvres (1967)
 The Doctor of St. Pauli (1968)
 The Priest of St. Pauli (1970)
 The Last Days of Gomorrah (1974, TV film)
  (1975, TV miniseries)

References

External links

1909 births
1982 deaths
Actors from Hanover
People from the Province of Hanover
German male film actors
German male television actors
20th-century German male actors
German military personnel of World War II
Recipients of the Cross of the Order of Merit of the Federal Republic of Germany
German prisoners of war in World War II